The members of the 14th General Assembly of Newfoundland were elected in the Newfoundland general election held in November 1882. The general assembly sat from 1883 to 1885.

A coalition of the Conservative and Liberal parties led by William Whiteway formed the government.

Robert Kent was chosen as speaker.

Sir John Hawley Glover served as colonial governor of Newfoundland.

Whiteway's government supported the construction of a railway to promote economic growth in the colony. The Newfoundland Railway Company laid 92 kilometres (57 miles) of track before going into receivership in 1884.

On Boxing Day 1883, members of the Orange Order marched through a Roman Catholic section of the town of Harbour Grace. In the resulting confrontation, known as the Harbour Grace Affray, three Orangemen and one Catholic were killed. A subsequent trial of those accused of killing the Orangemen failed to convict anyone because of the lack of witnesses willing to testify. This led to the breakup of Whiteway's coalition and he subsequently resigned as Premier.

Members of the Assembly 
The following members were elected to the assembly in 1882:

Notes:

By-elections 
By-elections were held to replace members for various reasons:

Notes:

References 

Newfoundland
Terms of the General Assembly of Newfoundland and Labrador